The Marikina North Sewage Treatment Plant is a sewage treatment plant in Marikina, Metro Manila, Philippines. Managed by Manila Water, the facility is the largest sewage treatment plant in the Philippines processing  of used water daily.

It is situated in the Balubad Resettlement Area in Barangay Nangka in Marikina. Aside from Marikina, the sewage treatment plant also covers the town of San Mateo in Rizal and other nearby areas. The facility discharges treated water to the Marikina River. The treatment plant makes use of the Sequence Batch Reactor biological treatment process.

The Marikina North Sewage Treatment Plant was inaugurated on November 24, 2016.

References

Sewage treatment plants in the Philippines
Buildings and structures in Marikina
Water supply and sanitation in Metro Manila